Lawrence Dermer is a Grammy nominated and BMI award winning record producer and multi-platinum songwriter.

Producer/songwriter Lawrence Dermer is best-known for creating the "Miami Sound" in his work with Gloria Estefan and the Miami Sound Machine, but has been involved in numerous other chart-topping acts as well. Dermer's impressive list of credentials include either composing, producing, arranging and performing on many multi platinum recordings with Jennifer Lopez, Madonna, Cher, Diddy, Mase, Busta Rhymes, BB King, Stephen Stills, Jimmy Page, Ted Nugent, Thalia, Ricky Martin, Jon Secada and many more (as well as for the soundtracks of Evita and The Specialist, among others), as well as doing remixes for Will Smith and Lenny Kravitz. Dermer has also produced live shows for Superbowl XXIX (featuring Tony Bennett and Patti LaBelle) and XXXIII (Stevie Wonder, Gloria Estefan, and Big Bad Voodoo Daddy), as well as a few Disney-related extravaganzas. Lawrence Dermer's chart topping successes include Conga, Bad Boy, The Electric Boogie, Rhythm's Gonna Get You, Turn The Beat Around, Reach, Arrasando, Feels So Good and Dangerous

References

External links
Lawrence Dermer at Discogs

20th-century American Jews
American record producers
American male songwriters
Living people
Jewish American musicians
Place of birth missing (living people)
21st-century American Jews
1962 births